Juan Mena Tormo (8 November 1924 – 1 June 1984) was a Spanish footballer who played as a forward for La Liga club Valencia.

Career
On 14 December 1941, Mena scored in his debut for Valencia in a 7–3 win over Celta de Vigo, aged 17 years and 36 days. He later won the 1941–42 La Liga with Valencia, which was their first league title ever.

He played for Valencia until 1947, where he won another two La Liga titles, before joining Hércules for two seasons. In 1949, he returned to Valencia, then he played for two seasons for Valencia Mestalla. He last played for Real Zaragoza in the 1954–55 season.

Honours
Valencia
La Liga: 1941–42, 1943–44, 1946–47
Copa del Generalísimo: 1954
Copa Eva Duarte: 1949

References

External links 
 
 
 

1924 births
1984 deaths
People from Torrent, Valencia
Sportspeople from the Province of Valencia
Spanish footballers
Association football forwards
La Liga players
Valencia CF players
Hércules CF players
Valencia CF Mestalla footballers
Real Zaragoza players